Elben Clive Folkes (April 4, 1873 – November 8, 1950) was an American lawyer and politician who served in both houses of the Virginia General Assembly.

References

External links 

Democratic Party members of the Virginia House of Delegates
19th-century American politicians
20th-century American politicians
1873 births
1950 deaths